Charles Henry Sands (May 23, 1910 in Fort William, Ontario – April 6, 1953) was a Canadian ice hockey right winger who played 12 seasons in the National Hockey League for the Toronto Maple Leafs, Boston Bruins, Montreal Canadiens and New York Rangers. Sands won the Stanley Cup with Boston in 1939.

Career statistics

Regular season and playoffs

External links

1910 births
1953 deaths
Boston Bruins players
Boston Cubs players
Canadian ice hockey forwards
Fresno Falcons players
Ice hockey people from Ontario
Los Angeles Monarchs players
Montreal Canadiens players
New York Rangers players
Pasadena Panthers players
Stanley Cup champions
Sportspeople from Thunder Bay
Syracuse Stars (IHL) players
Toronto Maple Leafs players
Washington Lions players
Canadian expatriate ice hockey players in the United States